O Canada!  was a Circle-Vision 360° film attraction at the Canada Pavilion, within Epcot's World Showcase at the Walt Disney World Resort in Florida. Its name derives from Canada's national anthem. It showcases many images of Canada's cities and sights, including Quebec, Ontario, the RCMP Musical Ride, the Calgary Stampede, Vancouver and Vancouver Harbour, the Ottawa River, and more.

The movie was filmed mostly during 1981 and has been in continuous exhibition since that time, with an updated version released in 2007. It closed on August 1, 2019, and was later replaced by a new Canadian Circle-Vision film titled Canada: Far and Wide.

History 

The attraction was inspired by the popular Circle-Vision 360° documentary film Canada '67, shown at the Telephone pavilion during Expo 67, created by Canadian film director Robert Barclay. The Disney version was described by Barclay as "a superficial, glib look at the country".

The following excerpt shows the similarities between the two films: the official Expo '67 Guide Book described some of the "Canada '67" documentary film's many scenes: "You're on centre stage for the RCMP Musical Ride... on centre ice for hockey... on the track at the Stampede! CIRCLE-VISION 360° surrounds you with all the fun and excitement of Canada's most thrilling events and its scenic beauty".

Footage for the RCMP musical ride was shot in Rockcliffe Park, located between the Rockcliffe Parkway and Hillsdale Road in the village of Rockcliffe Park and not at the RCMP stables located close by on Sandridge Rd.

The Canada '67 film also presented a bobsled hurtling down a steep ice track at the Quebec Winter Carnival, along with many other events and scenes iconic to the country. Viewers in the audience occasionally experienced vertigo after one particularly dramatic sequence filmed over Niagara Falls.

2007 update 

On August 6, 2007, the original exhibition of O' Canada! closed. On September 1, 2007, the new Circle-Vision 360 film debuted at the Canada Pavilion, made in part in response to a seven-year campaign by the Canadian Tourism Commission due to a steady stream of complaints over the years about the dated representation of Canada. O' Canada is primarily narrated by Martin Short, after he makes the original narrator (Corey Burton) angry enough to quit during an argument over the latter's inaccurate portrayal of Canada.

The newer version of O' Canada! includes updated footage of Canada's cities and natural features, including Niagara Falls and a new orchestral score by Bruce Broughton. The song "Canada (You're a Lifetime Journey)" has been re-recorded by Eva Avila, the winner of the fourth season of Canadian Idol.

This version of the attraction closed on August 1, 2019, for a new updated film.

See also 

 O Canada: the national anthem of Canada.
 Canada '67 (film)
 Bell Canada Pavilion (Expo 67)
 Circle-Vision 360°

References

External links 

 Canwest News - Article about movie update.

Amusement rides introduced in 1982
Amusement rides that closed in 2019
Epcot
1982 films
Circle-Vision 360° films
Documentary films about Canada
Walt Disney Parks and Resorts films
Films shot in Canada
World Showcase